The 2008 congressional elections in Missouri were held on November 4, 2008 to determine who will represent the state of Missouri in the United States House of Representatives.  The primary election for candidates seeking the nomination of the Republican Party, the Democratic Party, and the Libertarian Party was held on August 5.

Missouri has nine seats in the House, apportioned according to the 2000 United States Census.  Representatives are elected for two-year terms; those elected will serve in the 111th Congress from January 4, 2009 until January 3, 2011.  The election coincided with the 2008 U.S. presidential election.

The races not forecasted as safe for the incumbent party were 6 and 9; however, the Republicans held both seats.

Overview

District 1

Incumbent Democratic Congressman William Lacy Clay Jr. easily dispatched with Libertarian challenger Robb Cunningham in this St. Louis-based liberal district.

Democratic primary results

Libertarian primary results

General election results

District 2

Incumbent Republican Congressman Todd Akin easily won re-election to a fifth term over Democratic nominee Bill Haas and Libertarian candidate Thomas Knapp in this conservative district rooted in the northern and western suburbs of St. Louis.

Democratic primary results

Libertarian primary results

General election results

District 3

In this fairly liberal district based in the southern portion of St. Louis and previously represented by House Minority Leader Dick Gephardt, Democratic Congressman Russ Carnahan easily defeated Republican Chris Sander, Libertarian Kevin Babcock, and Constitution Party candidate Cindy Redburn to win a third term.

Democratic primary results

Republican primary results

Libertarian primary results

General election results

District 4

Long-serving incumbent Democratic Congressman Ike Skelton, the Chairman of the House Armed Services Committee, easily defeated Republican nominee Jeff Parnell in this conservative, west-central Missouri district to win a seventeenth term. By contrast, in the simultaneous 2008 presidential election the district gave 61 percent of its vote to Republican nominee John McCain and 38 percent to Democratic nominee Barack Obama, making this the only Missouri district with opposite results in the two elections.

Democratic primary results

Republican primary results

General election results

District 5

Democratic incumbent Congressman Emanuel Cleaver defeated Republican nominee Jacob Turk to win a third term in this fairly liberal district based in Kansas City.

Democratic primary results

Republican primary results

General election results

District 6

Incumbent Republican Congressman Sam Graves survived a high-profile challenge from Democratic nominee and former Kansas City Mayor Kay Barnes by a much healthier margin than expected. Barnes' inability to capitalize on the strong Democratic wave sweeping the country ultimately left her defeated in this normally conservative district based in northwest Missouri.

Republican primary results

Democratic primary results

Libertarian primary results

General election results

District 7

Incumbent Republican Congressman Roy Blunt, a former short-serving House Majority Leader defeated Democrat Richard Monroe, Libertarian Kevin Craig, and Constitution candidate Travis Maddox to easily win another term in office.

Republican primary results

Democratic primary results

Libertarian primary results

General election results

District 8

In this staunchly conservative district based in southeast Missouri, incumbent Republican Congresswoman Jo Ann Emerson had no difficulty in dispatching Democrat Joe Allen, Libertarian Branden McCullough, and Constitution candidate Richard Smith to win another term in office.

Republican primary results

Democratic primary results

Libertarian primary results

General election results

District 9

When Republican Congressman Kenny Hulshof declined to seek another term in favor of running for Governor, an open seat emerged. Former Missouri State Representative Blaine Luetkemeyer, the Republican nominee, defeated Democratic nominee Judy Baker, a member of the Missouri House of Representatives by a thin margin in this normally conservative district based in northeast Missouri, a part of "Little Dixie."

Republican primary results

Democratic primary results

Libertarian primary results

General election results

References

External links
Elections from the Missouri Secretary of State
U.S. Congress candidates for Missouri at Project Vote Smart
Campaign contributions for Missouri congressional races from OpenSecrets

2008
Missouri
United States House of Representatives